This is a list of disused Oslo Tramway stations that lists 19 tram stations in Oslo, Norway. The first stations to be closed were Ekebergparken, Simensbråten and Smedstua on the Simensbråten Line in 1967. In 2006, the stations Olav Kyrres plass, Halvdan Svartes gate and Nobels gate were merged into one.

Stations

See also 
 List of disused Oslo Metro stations

References

Bibliography